Never Happy, Ever After is the debut studio album by British pop punk band As It Is. Following four self-released EPs, the band signed to Fearless Records in October 2014. A week after the signing, the band went to record with producer James Paul Wisner in St. Cloud, Florida, United States. Never Happy, Ever After was released through Fearless on 20 April 2015.

Background
As It Is was started in spring 2012 by vocalist Patty Walters, who posted an advertisement stating that he was looking for musicians to be in a pop punk band using the online service Join My Band. Guitarist Andy Westhead and drummer Patrick Foley replied to the advertisement and were accepted into the band. Walters met guitarist Ben Biss while at university in Brighton. As It Is self-released three EPs. Following the release of a music video for "Can't Save Myself" in early February 2014 the band went on its first tour. The band's fourth EP, This Mind of Mine, was a crowdfunded effort, released in March 2014. On 2 October, it was announced the band signed to Fearless Records, the first UK band to do so. Walters called Fearless "one of my favorite record labels." Bands on Fearless "have played a huge role in my life, inspiring me massively".

Composition and recording
Rock Sound contributor Rob Sayce noted that the album was influenced by All Time Low's Nothing Personal (2009). Sayce wrote that the album "was another milestone release for UK pop-punk, and those sky-scraping choruses  bore the unmistakable mark of ATL." The band spent "a stupid amount of time on really making sure that is was the record we wanted", according to Walters. During the writing process, the band members had not seen their girlfriends in a few months. Walters called this "the hardest thing" he has had to face. "Dial Tones" was Walters and guitarist Ben Biss' way of handing the guilt the pair of them were facing. The bridge for the song was written at the Playhouse Theatre in London. The group demoed vocals for the song in the bar of the theatre.

A week after signing to Fearless, the band went to record in a studio located in St. Cloud, Florida, with James Paul Wisner and the band producing the sessions. Recording was done over the course of five-and-a-half weeks. Working with Wisner was "a huge learning curve" for the band, according to Walters. Wisner mixed the album, before it was mastered by Brad Blackwood at Euphonics.

Release
On 20 January 2015, "Dial Tones" was released as a single. The music video for which was made by LifeIsArtFilms. On 23 February, Never Happy, Ever After was announced for release, and the artwork was revealed. Between late February and early April, As It Is supported Set It Off on the Glamour Kills Spring Break '15 tour. On 3 March, "Concrete" was made available for steaming. On 14 April, the album was made available for streaming. On the same day, the music video for "Cheap Shots & Setbacks" was released. The video was made by Dan Centrone. Never Happy, Ever After was released by Fearless Records on 20 April. In May, the band went on a co-headlining tour with This Wild Life with support from Seaway and Boston Manor. The band played on the 2015 Warped Tour; a music video was released for "Sorry" on 11 September with footage from the tour.

Following this, they embarked on tours of Japan and Australia, leading up to a support slot for Mayday Parade on the 2015 Alternative Press Tour in October and November. On 10 November, a music video for "Speak Soft" premiered through Alternative Press website; it was made by LifeIsArtVisuals and filmed on a beach in Newcastle in Australia in the early hours of the morning. In December, the band supported Lower Than Atlantis on their tour of the UK. In February and March, the band supported Sleeping with Sirens on the UK tour. A deluxe edition of the album was released on 8 April 2016. It featured a new song, "Winter's Weather", and acoustic versions of three tracks: "Dial Tones", "Cheap Shots & Setbacks" and "Concrete". A music video had been released for "Winter's Weather" the previous day.

Reception

"Dial Tones" was included on Alternative Presss "12 New Songs You Need To Hear From January 2015" list. The album was included at number 19 on Rock Sounds top 50 releases of 2015 list.

Track listing
All music and lyrics written by As It Is.

Bonus tracks

Personnel
Personnel per booklet.

As It Is
 Patty Walters – lead vocals, acoustic guitar
 Ben Biss – vocals, guitar
 Andy Westhead – guitar
 Alistair Testo – bass
 Patrick Foley – drums

Production and design
 James Paul Wisner – producer
 As It Is – producer
 Brad Blackwood – mastering
 Felicia Simon – artwork concept, photography
 Mike Farrell – layout
 Tom Bornarel – As It Is Logo

Chart positions

References
 Citations

Sources

External links

Never Happy, Ever After at YouTube (streamed copy where licensed)

As It Is (band) albums
2015 debut albums
Fearless Records albums
Albums produced by James Paul Wisner